Mount Napier in Victoria, Australia, is one of the youngest volcanoes in Australia. It erupted about 32,000 years ago. It was named by Major Thomas Mitchell after the three Napier brothers, who he had served alongside during the Peninsular War. Mitchell named it in August 1836, during his third expedition across south-eastern Australia. The local Aboriginal name for the mount is Tapoc. Mount Napier State Park is located 270 kilometres west of Melbourne and 17 km south of Hamilton.

Location and features
Mount Napier or Tapoc in the local Aboriginal language, has a composite lava shield with a superimposed scoria cone. Mount Napier is part of the Newer Volcanics Province, which is the youngest volcanic region in Australia.

The Mount Napier Lava Flow followed the Harman Valley west from the volcano, and then south towards nearby Mount Eccles which is 25 km south-west of Mount Napier.  Lava blisters or tumuli occur along the flow - these are house-sized mounds of basalt rocks.  The blisters are the best developed in Australia and uncommon in the rest of the world.  They are formed by the pressure of liquid lava pushing up against the crust. Several caves and lava tubes can also be found at Byaduk.

The native vegetation of Mount Napier State Park, on the western side of the mountain, varies from grassy woodland to tall open forest dominated by Manna Gum Eucalyptus viminalis, Blackwood Acacia melanoxylon, Austral Bracken Pteridium esculentum and Common Tussock Grass Poa labillardieri. This hosts a variety of native fauna, including birds, marsupials and mammals, including bats (Bird 1997).

Gallery

See also

List of mountains in Victoria
List of volcanoes in Australia

References

External links 
Mt Napier State Park
Byaduk Caves

Mountains of Victoria (Australia)
Volcanoes of Victoria (Australia)
Inactive volcanoes
Mountains of Barwon South West (region)